Julius Riyadi Cardinal Darmaatmadja (born 20 December 1934) is an Indonesian cardinal of the Roman Catholic Church. He was created a cardinal in 1994, becoming the second Indonesian to be a cardinal. He served as the Archbishop of Semarang from 1983 to 1996 and Archbishop of Jakarta from 1996 to 2010.

Biography
Darmaatmadja entered Saint Peter Canisius Minor seminary in Magelang, Central Java in 1951 and Society of Jesus in 1957. He studied philosophy from 1961 to 1964 at De Nobili College, Pontifical Athenaeum, Pune, Maharashtra and theology from 1966 to 1970 at Saint Ignatius College, Yogyakarta. He was ordained priest on 18 December 1969 by Cardinal Justinus Darmojuwono. He was then assigned as parish priest in the Archdiocese of Semarang from 1971 to 1973, in Indonesian Province of the Society of Jesus from 1973 to 1978, and then as Rector of Saint Peter Canisius minor seminary from 1978 to 1981. He served as Provincial of the Indonesian Province of the Society of Jesus from 1981 to 1983.

On 19 February 1983 Pope John Paul II appointed him Archbishop of Semarang; he received episcopal consecration from Justinus Darmojuwono on 29 June 1983. On 28 April 1984, he was also appointed Ordinary of the Indonesian Military Forces (ABRI) Ordinariate.

He was created Cardinal-Priest of titular see of S Cuore di Maria by Pope John Paul II on 26 November 1994 consistory, and became the second Indonesian cardinal after Cardinal Darmojuwono, who died earlier that year. Upon the retirement of Leo Soekoto he was appointed Archbishop of Jakarta and installed on 11 January 1996. He was elected President of National Bishops' Conference of Indonesia from 1988 to 1997 and again from 2001 to 2006.

He submitted his resignation upon reaching mandatory retirement age of 75 and Pope Benedict XVI accepted his retirement on 28 June 2010. He was automatically succeeded as Archbishop of Jakarta by the Coadjutor Archbishop Ignatius Suharyo Hardjoatmodjo.

As a Cardinal, he participated in the Papal conclave, 2005, which elected Pope Benedict XVI. Although he was eligible to participate as a cardinal-elector, he did not attend the Papal conclave, 2013, following Pope Benedict XVI's resignation, due to health reasons. He ceased to be a cardinal-elector on his 80th birthday 20 December 2014.

Views
He has rejected the identification of Islam with terrorism, called upon Christians to forgive Islamic radicals behind church bombings in 2000, and was an outspoken critic of the US-led war in Iraq.

See also
Jesuit cardinal

References

External links

 
 Cardinali fotografie galeria; Vatican News Services

1934 births
Living people
Javanese people
Indonesian cardinals
20th-century Roman Catholic archbishops in Indonesia
21st-century Roman Catholic archbishops in Indonesia
Cardinals created by Pope John Paul II
Members of the Pontifical Council for Culture
Indonesian Jesuits
Jesuit cardinals
People from Magelang Regency